Nick Palmer (born 8 October 1991) is an Australian rugby union player who played for the  in the Super Rugby competition.  His position of choice is lock.

References 

Australian rugby union players
1991 births
Living people
Rugby union locks
Rugby union players from Newcastle, New South Wales
New South Wales Waratahs players